Mykola Labovskyi, sometimes Mykola Labovskyy (born 4 May 1983) is a Ukrainian middle distance runner.

Achievements

References

1983 births
Living people
Ukrainian male middle-distance runners
Olympic athletes of Ukraine
Athletes (track and field) at the 2012 Summer Olympics
Sportspeople from Chernivtsi Oblast